The Indiana PGA Championship is a golf tournament that is the championship of the Indiana section of the PGA of America. Although the Indiana section was chartered in 1924, there were no section championships held until 1936. Todd Smith, member of the Indiana Golf Hall of Fame, holds the record with six victories. PGA Tour winners who also won this tournament include Bob Mann, who partnered with Wayne Levi to win the 1978 Walt Disney World National Team Championship, and Bob Hamilton, who won the PGA Championship in 1944.

Winners 

 2022 Timothy Wiseman
 2021 Michael Asbell
 2020 Chris Smith
 2019 Michael Asbell
 2018 Brad Fellers
 2017 Craig Bowden
 2016 Brett Melton
 2015 Craig Bowden
 2014 John DalCorobbo
 2013 Jeff March
 2012 John DalCorobbo
 2011 John DalCorobbo
 2010 David Carich
 2009 Todd Smith
 2008 Jim Ousley
 2007 John DalCorrobo
 2006 Quinn Griffing
 2005 Alan Schulte
 2004 Brad Fellers
 2003 Scott Pieri
 2002 Brad Fellers
 2001 Todd Smith
 2000 Alan Schulte
 1999 Todd Smith
 1998 Denny Hepler
 1997 Todd Smith
 1996 Todd Smith
 1995 Gary Sowinski
 1994 Todd Smith
 1993 Denny Hepler
 1992 Greg Havill
 1991 Scott Steger
 1990 Cary Hungate
 1989 Scott Steger
 1988 Cary Hungate
 1987 Cary Hungate
 1986 Bill Shumaker
 1985 Cary Hungate
 1984 Bill Shumaker
 1983 Bill Mattingly
 1982 Bob Mann
 1981 Bob Mann
 1980 Mal McMullen
 1979 Don Padgett II
 1978 Geoff Hensley
 1977 Bill Shumaker
 1976 Jim Barber
 1975 Don Padgett II
 1974 Bob Placido
 1973 George Thomas
 1972 Bill Miller, Sr.
 1971 Don Essig III
 1970 Sam Carmichael
 1969 Arnold Koehler
 1968 Alan White
 1967 Ed Knych
 1966 Jim Guinnup
 1965 Ed Knych
 1964 Ed Knych
 1963 Ed Knych
 1962 Charlie Harter
 1961 William Heinlein
 1960 Don Street
 1959 Jim Guinnup
 1958 Jim Guinnup
 1957 Charlie Harter
 1956 Jimmy Scott
 1955 Jim Guinnup
 1954 William Heinlein
 1953 Wayne Timberman
 1952 Mike DeMassey
 1951 Todd Houck
 1950 Charlie Harter
 1949 Charlie Harter
 1948 William Heinlein
 1947 Wayne Timberman
 1946 William Heinlein
 1945 William Heinlein
 1944 Bob Hamilton
 1943 Bob Hamilton
 1942 Wayne Timberman
 1941 Bud Williamson
 1940 Russell Stonehouse
 1939 John Watson
 1938 Bud Williamson
 1937 Ralph Stonehouse
 1936 Bud Williamson

References

External links 
PGA of America – Indiana section

Golf in Indiana
PGA of America sectional tournaments
Recurring sporting events established in 1936